Nationality words link to articles with information on the nation's poetry or literature (for instance, Irish or France).

Events

Works published

Great Britain
 Anonymous, verse paraphrase of Robert Greene's Pandosto 1588
 William Alabaster, Roxana, tragædia (approximate date)
 Barnabe Barnes, 
 Richard Barnfield, Cynthia
 Nicholas Breton, 
 Thomas Campion, Poemata
 George Chapman, published anonymously, allegorical recounting of Ovid's courtship of Corinna
 Thomas Churchyard, 
 Samuel Daniel,  (a fifth book later appeared without a title page or a date; see also  1599, Works 1601 (six books), and  1609, the first complete edition, in eight books)
 Thomas Edwards, Cephalus and Procris, Narcissus
 Stephen Gosson, published anonymously but ascribed to Gosson, a coarse satiric poem
 Thomas Lodge, A Fig for Momus, verse satires
 Gervase Markham, The Poem of Poems, or Syon's Muse
 Thomas Morley, editor, First Book of Ballets in Five Voices
 George Peele, playwright, The Old Wives Tale (play) printed
 Francis Sabie, The Fisher-mans Tale: Of the famous Actes, Life, and Loue of Cassander, a Grecian Knight
 Sir Philip Sidney, An Apology for Poetry, English criticism (written between 1580–1583; published for the first time posthumously)
 Saint Robert Southwell:
 Moeniae
 Saint Peters Complaint, with Other Poemes, published anonymously; three editions this year; it is possible there were several manuscripts in circulation before the first printed edition appeared (see also S. Peters Complaint 1616)
 Edmund Spenser:
 Amoretti and Epithalamion
 , includes , and other laments on the death of Sidney by Sir Walter Ralegh and others

Other
 Luís de Camões, Rimas, Portugal

Births
Death years link to the corresponding "[year] in poetry" article:
 December 4 – Jean Chapelain (died 1674), French poet and writer
 Also:
 Thomas Carew (died 1640), English poet
 Jean Desmarets de Saint-Sorlin (died 1676), French poet and playwright
 Bihari Lal (died 1663), Hindi poet, wrote the Satasaī (Seven Hundred Verses)
 Francesco Pona (died 1655), Italian doctor, philosopher, Marinist poet and writer
 Maciej Kazimierz Sarbiewski (died 1640), Polish Jesuit and Latin-language poet
 Robert Sempill the younger (died c.1663), Scottish poet

Deaths
Birth years link to the corresponding "[year] in poetry" article:
 February 21 – Saint Robert Southwell (born c. 1561), English poet and Catholic martyr; executed as a traitor
 March 18 – Jean de Sponde (born 1557), French poet, writer, translator and humanist
 April 25 – Torquato Tasso (born 1544), Italian
 May 25 – Valens Acidalius (born 1567), German, Latin-language poet and critic
 October 15 – Faizi (born 1547), Indian poet laureate of the Emperor Akbar
 November 5 – Luis Barahona de Soto (born 1548), Spanish
 Also:
 Meurig Dafydd (born c. 1510), Welsh bard
 Thomas Edwards (born unknown), English author of two Ovid inspired epic poems Cephalus and Procris and Narcissus

See also

 Poetry
 16th century in poetry
 16th century in literature
 Dutch Renaissance and Golden Age literature
 Elizabethan literature
 English Madrigal School
 French Renaissance literature
 Renaissance literature
 Spanish Renaissance literature
 University Wits

Notes

16th-century poetry
Poetry
1595 poems